Borovlyanka is a rural locality (a selo) in Sosnovsky Selsoviet, Zarinsky District, Altai Krai, Russia. The population was 38 as of 2013. There are 4 streets.

Geography 
Borovlyanka is located 57 km northeast of Zarinsk (the district's administrative centre) by road. Golukha is the nearest rural locality.

References 

Rural localities in Zarinsky District